Gallina is a village in Tuscany, central Italy, administratively a frazione of the comune of Castiglione d'Orcia, province of Siena. At the time of the 2001 census its population was 157.

Gallina is about 54 km from Siena and 9 km from Castiglione d'Orcia.

References 

Frazioni of Castiglione d'Orcia